The Killers are an American rock band from Las Vegas, Nevada. After forming in late 2001 when Dave Keuning's advertisement in a music paper was answered by Brandon Flowers, Mark Stoermer and Ronnie Vannucci Jr., a Warner Bros. employee recommended them to Lizard King Records, who signed them. The band consequently went to England to record their 2004 debut album Hot Fuss, which earned them five nominations at the Grammy Awards and has sold over 5,000,000 copies.

Their second album, Sam's Town earned the band the BRIT Awards Best International Album at the 2007 BRIT Awards and two nominations at the Grammy Awards. The band's third studio album, Day & Age, was nominated for Best International Album at the BRIT Awards and was twice nominated at the 2009 NME Awards where the group won Best International Band. The fourth studio album, Battle Born, was released concurrent to the band winning its fourth NME Award for Best International Band.  Fifth studio album, Wonderful Wonderful earned the band a fourth Brit Awards nomination for Best International Group.

AltRock Awards
The AltRock Award is presented annually by the American radio station i99Radio.

|-
|align="center" rowspan="3" | 2018 || The Killers || Artist of the Year|| 
|-
| Wonderful Wonderful || Album of the Year || 
|-
| Brandon Flowers || Best Male Singer || 
|-

American Music Awards 
Created by Dick Clark in 1973, the American Music Awards is an annual music awards ceremony and one of several major annual American music awards shows.

ASCAP Awards 
The annual ASCAP Awards honor its top members and songwriters.  ASCAP is a US based performance rights organization.  The Killers received their highest honor for a group for their musical genre's "impact on the future of American music".

Billboard Music Awards 
The Billboard Music Awards are an annual awards show from Billboard Magazine.  The awards are based on sales data by Nielsen SoundScan and radio information by Nielsen Broadcast Data Systems.

Brit Awards 
The Brit Awards are the British Phonographic Industry's annual pop music awards. The Killers have won two awards from seven nominations.

Esky Music Awards 
The Esky Music Awards are awarded annually by Esquire, a men's magazine by the Hearst Corporation.

Grammy Awards 
The Grammy Awards are awarded annually by the National Academy of Recording Arts and Sciences. The Killers have been nominated seven times.

Jacques Lu Cont's "Thin White Duke Remix" of "Mr. Brightside" also received a nomination in 2006 for Best Remixed Recording, Non-Classical.

Guild of Music Supervisors Awards

Ibiza Music Video Festival 
Ibiza Music Video Festival is the online music video competition. Rupert Bryan and Elizabeth Fear founded the event in 2013.

|-
| rowspan="2" | 2017
| rowspan="2" | "The Man"
| Best DOP
| 
|-
| Best Costume 
|

International Dance Music Awards 
The International Dance Music Awards are an annual awards show honoring dance and electronic artists and are distributed by the Winter Music Conference.

Meteor Ireland Music Awards 
The Meteor Music Awards are Ireland's national music awards. The Killers have won one award from nine nominations.

MTV

MTV Australia Awards 
The MTV Australia Awards (previously known as the MTV Australia Video Music Awards or AVMAs) started in 2005, where Australia celebrates both local and international acts.

MTV Europe Music Awards 
The MTV Europe Music Awards were established in 1994 by MTV Europe to celebrate the most popular music videos in Europe.

MTV Video Music Awards 
The MTV Video Music Awards were established in 1984 by MTV to celebrate the top music videos of the year.

mtvU Woodie Awards 
The mtvU Woodie Awards are awarded annually in recognition of "the music voted best by college students".

MuchMusic Video Awards 
The MuchMusic Video Awards is an annual awards ceremony honoring the best music videos of Canadian artists.

Music Video Production Awards 
The MVPA Awards are annually presented by a Los Angeles-based music trade organization to honor the year's best music videos.

NARM Awards 
The NARM Awards are presented annually by the National Association of Recording Merchandisers.

NME

NME Awards UK 
Founded by the music magazine NME, the NME Awards are awarded annually. The Killers have won seven awards from twenty-four nominations.

NME Awards USA 
The Killers were the main winners at the 2008 inaugural NME Awards USA.

NRJ Music Awards 
Created by the radio station NRJ, the NRJ Music Awards are awarded annually, in partnership with the television network TF1 in Cannes, France, as the opening of MIDEM.

People's Choice Awards 
The People's Choice Awards is an annual awards show created in 1975 recognizing the people and the work of popular culture.

Premios 40 Principales
The Premios 40 Principales is an annual Spanish awards show that recognizes the people and works of pop musicians.

|-
| align="center"| 2009
| The Killers
| Best International Artist
|

Q Awards 
The Q Awards, established in 1985, are the UK's annual music awards and are run by the music magazine Q.

Shortlist Music Prize 
The Shortlist Music Prize is awarded annually to an album released in the United States within the last year, as chosen by a panel of musicians, producers and journalists, known as the "Listmakers".

TEC Awards 
The Technical Excellence & Creativity Awards are distributed annually by the Mix Foundation for Excellence in Audio.

UK Festival Awards
The UK Festival Awards were established in 2004 and are produced by Virtual Festivals.com.  They are voted for by the public via the UK Festival Awards website and receive hundreds of thousands of votes annually. To ensure fairness, the votes are weighted to take into account the event capacity. 

|-
|rowspan="2"|2007
|The Killers
|Best Festival Rock Act
|
|-
|The Killers
|Best Headline Act
|
|-
|rowspan="1"|2014
|The Killers
|Best Headline Act
|
|-

World Music Awards 
The international World Music Awards annually honors recording artists based on their worldwide sales figures, which are provided by the International Federation of the Phonographic Industry.

Miscellaneous awards

References

External links 
 The Killers
 The Killers official site, from Island Records
 The Killers official site (U.K.), from the Vertigo label

Awards
Lists of awards received by American musician
Lists of awards received by musical group